{{Infobox school
 | name                    = Turner Fenton Secondary School
 | image                   = Turner Fenton SS Logo.gif
 | imagesize               = 240px
 | streetaddress           = 7935 Kennedy Road South
 | city                    = Brampton
 | province                = Ontario
 | postalcode              = L6W 0A2
 | country                 = Canada
 | website                 = 
 | motto                   = Remis velisque
 | schoolnumber            = 918440
 | schoolboard             = Peel District School Board
 | endowment               = $2 million
 | superintendent          = Michelle Stubbings
 | trustee                 = Kathy McDonaldSusan Benjamin
 | principal               = Kevin Williams
 | principal1              = Christine GuadagnoloBrianna ManningNadira LawrenceChristopher Greenfield
 | principal_label1        = Vice principals
 | schooltype              = High school
 | grades_label            = Grades
 | grades                  = 9-12+
 | language                = English, Extended French
 | team_name               = Trojans
 | colours                 = Royal Blue, Black, White and Silver 
 | newspaper               = Turneround (1977–2014)Trojan Times (2014–)
 | established             = 
 | founded                 = 1992 merger (1972, 1974)
 | enrollment              = 1524
 | enrollment_as_of        = April 3, 2022
}}
Turner Fenton Secondary School is a high school in the Peel Region, located in Brampton, Ontario. The principal is Kevin Williams. It is operated by the Peel District School Board, and is credited as one of the highest funded schools in Ontario, with an endowment of $2 million.

Feeder schools (elementary & middle schools whose graduates usually go to Turner Fenton) include Peel Alternative School North, Cherrytree Public School, Fletcher's Creek Sr. Public School, Helen Wilson Public School, Hickory Wood Public School, Parkway Public School, Sir Wilfrid Laurier Public School and William G. Davis Sr. Public School.

Turner Fenton Secondary School's name is inherited from two schools that were later merged, which were named after J. A. Turner, the first director of the Peel board, and W. J. Fenton, a pioneer educator. Thus, Turner Fenton has two buildings, often referred to as "North" and "South".

Programs
Turner Fenton Secondary School (TFSS) is known for its high academic standards, with consistently high rankings on standardized  tests.

Turner, as it is commonly referred to, is a diverse school, due to the varied array of programs it offers. The following educational programs are available:
 Regular program
 Applied and college preparation courses
 Academic, university preparation and university/college preparation courses
 Open courses
 Vocational Level 1 and 2 Programs (Basic and Special Basic Programs)
 Autism Spectrum Disorder (ASD) Resource Program
 International Baccalaureate Middle Years Programme (MYP Year 4 and 5) and Diploma Programme (DP)
 English as a Second Language/English Learning Development
 Extended French
 Specialist High Skills Major (SHSM)
 Hospitality and Tourism
 Transportation
 Specific Learning Disabilities Program (Learning Strategies)
 Chef Training Program, dubbed "Recipe for Success", a dedicated hospitality/chef training program

Until the end of the 2004-2005 school year, the Regional Enhanced Program was also available for students in grades 11 and 12 at Turner Fenton.

International Baccalaureate

Turner Fenton offers the International Baccalaureate (IB) Middle Years Programme (MYP) for grade 9 and 10 students (MYP Year 4 and 5) and the IB Diploma Programme (DP) for grade 11 and 12 students. The MYP, based on similar principles as the DP, is offered as preparation for the DP, requiring students to engage in the study of languages, sciences, mathematics, and humanities all in an attempt for them to recognize not only the individuality of each of the disciplines but also to understand the co-relation between them. The DP is a globally recognized program that prepares students for university. From 2009, Turner Fenton's DP students have displayed considerable academic excellence with some students topping in the Peel District School Board nearly every year with a 100% average.

The admission process into the IB program at Turner Fenton Secondary School is highly selective. Students from more than 100 elementary schools all over Brampton apply for the rigorous high school program. In 2014, the application includes basic identification information, previous report cards and an online written response about an extracurricular activity and its demonstration of an IB Learner Profile attribute. Students from across the Peel District School Board apply to be a part of the program but only around 165 students are accepted each year. MYP students feed directly into the Diploma Programme in grade 11.

Sports, clubs, and traditions

CultureFest
CultureFest, called Diversity Celebration until 1996, has been an annual event held at Turner Fenton Secondary School since the founding of the school. It was started by students at J. A. Turner SS and was inherited by Turner Fenton after the merger. The festival is entirely student-run and consists of live performances, educational booths and workshops, as well as a marketplace of international foods spread over two days and one performance night.

Turner Fenton also has clubs pertaining to cultural diversity and identity, including the Sikh Students Association (SSA) and Turner Fenton Tamil Association. These groups enlighten students about cultural diversity and hope to empower youth in becoming active cultural members in school and in society.

Conferences
Throughout the school year, many students are actively involved in a variety of different leadership conferences. Turner Fenton students run the annual START (Students: The Active Risk-Takers) conference, a 2-day event open to all Peel high school students. Moreover, the IB (International Baccalaureate) students of the school run the annual one-day Mentorship Conference (IBMC) in September of every year, introducing the new Grade 9 MYP (Middle Years Programme) students to the high school atmosphere. Turner Fenton students are also recognized for their high involvement in the Peel Student Presidents' Council, whether students are executives on the council itself or take part in the yearly leadership conference as delegates, security or leadership developers.

The SOAR (Suddenly Opportunities Are Reachable) conference, which is a leadership conference held at the end of May for Peel middle-school students in grades 7 and 8, is also organized by Turner Fenton students. Due to lack of positive response from teachers, the conference temporarily stopped taking place. However, in 2012, the conference was restarted and took place at W. G. Davis Sr. Public School, a feeder school for Turner Fenton. Because Ontario high school teachers protested against Bill 115 by not leading extracurricular activities, the conference did not take place in 2013 either. Since 2014, the SOAR conference has been taking place again at Turner Fenton.

In December 2014, Turner Fenton hosted its first French conference Imaginons le Français, promoting francophone culture.

 HOSA 
Since 2015, Turner Fenton HOSA has been one of the largest extracurricular activities offered at Turner Fenton S.S., providing opportunities for motivated students to develop their scientific knowledge and their leadership abilities in a fun and engaging manner. Just as laboratories in science classes allow students to put theory into practice, the HOSA lab lets members test their personal and leadership skills in real life. HOSA members have the opportunity to participate and/or compete in area, state and international leadership conferences. Motivated students polish their skills and receive a sense of self-accomplishment as well as recognition. Through those leadership experiences, HOSA provides students with opportunities to become the best they can be as they pursue rewarding and challenging careers in the vital health professions. HOSA provides opportunities for the student to make a well-informed career choice among the many health occupations, which in turn aids the students in making a more realistic career goal.

DECA
Turner Fenton also has an elite DECA chapter with members ranking highly in the Regional, Provincial, and International levels. The DECA Regionals take place in November. Students who succeed in the Regionals move to the next stage which is known as DECA Provincials. Provincials take place in February and in downtown Toronto. Each year, students representing TFSS DECA attain top places in their respective chapters and move to the final stage; the International Career Development Conference (ICDC) where they represent Team Canada. TFSS DECA prepares its students by providing the essential skill sets to perform at each stage of DECA.

History
Turner Fenton Secondary School is composed of two buildings, called the North Hall and the South Hall. Until 1992, the two buildings were each schools in their own right, the North being J. A. Turner SS, and the South being W. J. Fenton SS. W. J. Fenton was the first of the two to open in 1972, built by Val Mitchell Construction. C.A. Smith built J. A. Turner Secondary in 1974. Both buildings were designed by architect Don E. Skinner Thughliphe.

The rooms of the North Hall are numbered 100s and 200s on the first floor and second floor, respectively; the South Hall rooms are numbered 300s on the first floor and 400s on the second floor. The portables are 500s. Each faculty department generally has its own section of the school. The English, math, science, business/technology and music departments, as well as the library and main administration, are in the North Hall. The history, moderns (French and other language studies), geography, arts (dramatic, visual, digital, culinary and cosmetic) departments are in the South Building. However, there are exceptions, such as certain biology classes that are taught in the South Hall. Administrative offices are split between the two buildings, with certain vice principals and guidance counsellors located specifically in the South Hall.  Each building also has a cafeteria, the North Hall cafeteria being the larger of the two. Additionally, as the South Hall was equipped to serve culinary arts teaching, the cafeteria in the South Hall allows students to make/serve food.

Following the merger of the schools in 1992, the school was referred to officially on its main outdoor signage as "Turner Fenton Secondary School," but it had also adopted a secondary brand name "Turner Fenton Campus" used on school letterhead.  In the early 2000s (decade), the school board forced Turner Fenton to standardize its name, because the school had not filed the proper forms upon its creation in 1992.

Notable alumni

 Charles Allen, Olympic hurdler and sprinter
 Aaron Ashmore, actor (Smallville)
 Shawn Ashmore, actor (X-Men, X2, Terry'')
 Navdeep Bains, Liberal MP for Mississauga—Malton, and Minister of Innovation, Science and Economic Development
 Rupan Bal, Punjabi actor
 Vic Dhillon, former member of Provincial Parliament
 Matt Duchene, Forward, Nashville Predators  
 Paul Ferreira, former Member of Provincial Parliament
 Jonita Gandhi, Canadian Bollywood Singer
 Allison Higson, swimmer and Olympic bronze medallist in the 1988 Seoul Games.
 Rupi Kaur, poet & writer
 Rob Maver, Punter, Calgary Stampeders
 Anna Mather, NDP candidate
 Johnny Reid, country singer
 Jason Spezza, Center, Toronto Maple Leafs
 Courtney Stephen, defensive back, Hamilton Tiger-Cats
 Raffi Torres, Left Wing, Toronto Maple Leafs
 Kate Van Buskirk, cross-country runner
 Roy Woods, musician

See also
List of high schools in Ontario

References

External links
 Turner Fenton Secondary School, official website
 
 eksmultani.github.io, Map of Turner Fenton

Peel District School Board
High schools in Brampton
International Baccalaureate schools in Ontario
Educational institutions established in 1992
1992 establishments in Ontario